Petrus Gyllius or Gillius (or Pierre Gilles) (1490–1555) was a French natural scientist, topographer and translator.

Gilles was born in Albi, southern France.  A great traveller, he studied the Mediterranean and Orient, producing such works as De Topographia Constantinopoleos et de illius antiquitatibus libri IV, Cosmæ Indopleutes and De Bosphoro Thracio libri III ,in which he provided the first written account of he Bosphorus, albeit in Latin, as well as a book about the fish of the Mediterranean. Sent by King Francis I of France to Constantinople in 1544-47  to find ancient manuscripts, he discovered a manuscript of the geographical work of Dionysius of Byzantium and wrote a Latin paraphrase of it. Most of his books were published after his death by his nephew. In 1533 he also translated Claudius Aelianus 

He died of malaria in Rome while following his patron, Cardinal Georges d'Armagnac.

Representation in fiction
As Pierre Gilles, Petrus Gyllius plays a small but significant role in Pawn in Frankincense, the fourth volume in the historical fiction series, The Lymond Chronicles, by Dorothy Dunnett.

References

Further reading

External links

People from Albi
1490 births
1555 deaths
16th-century Latin-language writers
French Renaissance humanists
French male non-fiction writers
16th-century French translators